Kampung Baru or Kampong Bharu (meaning "New Village") is a Malay enclave in central Kuala Lumpur, Malaysia. One of the most valuable tracts of land in the capital, it has been estimated to be worth up to US$1.4 billion.

Location
Kampung Baru is located in the northern part of Kuala Lumpur's central business district. It is separated from KLCC district by a section of the Klang River. 

Kampung Baru is bordered by Jalan Tun Razak in the north, Jalan Tuanku Abdul Rahman in the west, Jalan Dewan Sultan Sulaiman in the southwest, and the Klang River and the Ampang-KL toll road (E 12) in the southeast.

Clockwise, from north to south, Kampung Baru borders Titiwangsa, Dato' Keramat, Ampang Hilir, KLCC, Medan Tuanku and Chow Kit.

History

Kampung Baru was established in 1899 by a grant from the then-Sultan of Selangor, Sultan Alaeddin Suleiman Shah, to allow the Malays to retain their village lifestyle within the city. It was formally gazetted as the Malay Agricultural Settlement in 1950.

Since then Kampung Baru has held out against development and modern-city living, turning into a political symbol of Malay culture.

The area held a special place for Malay politics during the pro-independence movement that grew up after World War II. Kampung Baru is home to the Sultan Sulaiman Club, where anti-colonial political gatherings were often held, including those that led to the formation of the United Malays National Organisation (UMNO), Malaysia's ruling party since independence until 2018, and then again since 2021. Documents dating back to the period were unearthed at the grounds of the Club several years ago.

Kampung Baru, which sprawls over almost 4 km2, was among the hardest-hid areas during the May 13 Incident in 1969, where bloody racial clashes occurred between ethnic Malays and Chinese. The riots started after Chinese-led opposition parties marched through the village to celebrate their good showing in general elections of that year. New research (May 13: Declassified Documents on the Malaysian Riots of 1969) based on newly declassified documents at the Public Records Office in London, the book alleged that contrary to the official account which had blamed the violence on opposition parties, the riot had been intentionally started by the "ascendent state capitalist class" in UMNO as a coup d'état to topple the Tunku from power.

In recent years, Kampung Baru also played a central role in the Reformasi protests of 1998, when former deputy premier Anwar Ibrahim launched protests against then premier Mahathir Mohamad, calling for reforms to government and the judiciary.

Developments

Plans to redevelop Kampung Baru had been around since the 2000s, and intensified in recent years. Negotiations between kampung residents and successive governments have been ongoing since 2018.

Amenities and notable landmarks

Healthcare
Kampung Baru district is notable for being home to Kuala Lumpur Hospital and the National Heart Institute.

Other landmarks
 Kelab Sultan Sulaiman
 Galeri Kelab Sultan Sulaiman
 National Library of Malaysia
  Kampung Baru station, part of Kelana Jaya Line of Rapid KL
 NAZA Group headquarters
 Masjid Jamek Kampung Baru
 Rumah Limas Kampung Baru
 Master Mat's House
 Tatt Khalsa Diwan Gurdwara
 Jalan Raja Muda Musa
 Jalan Raja Alang
 Sikh Temple
 Saloma Link

Access
 Kampung Baru metro station, serving the Rapid KL Kelana Jaya Line, is located in the southern part of Kampung Baru.

 Chow Kit Monorail station is located at the western end of Kampung Baru.

Bus routes running through Kampung Baru include 220 and 302.

The Saloma Link pedestrian bridge, spanning the Klang River and the Ampang-Kuala Lumpur toll road, is a shortcut from Kampung Baru to the Petronas Towers.

The upcoming MRT Putrajaya Line will serve Kampung Baru via the Raja Uda station, scheduled to open in 2023.

Notable residents
 Tan Sri S.M. Salim - Malaysian singer
 Tan Sri SM Nasimuddin SM Amin - Naza Group Chairman
 Tan Sri Dato' Azman Hashim - AmBank Group Chairman
 Dato' Mohamed Azlan Hashim - Proton Ex Chairman
 Dato' Zainal Abidin Putih - Chairman CIMB Bank Bhd.
 Dato Mat Shah Safuan - businessman
 Dato Seri Drs Suleiman Mohamed - former Deputy Minister of Information, politician
 Allahyarham M Shariff - Malaysian singer
 Sheikh Hassan bin Sheikh Mubarak - businessman, trader

See also
 Kampung Padang Balang

References

 Planet Ark - Malay Village Clings Onto its City-Centre Address
 New documents suggest Umno has origins in KL, The Star, 14 December 2007.
 Kampung Baru plan expected out in April, The Star, 26 January 2008.

Suburbs in Kuala Lumpur
Villages in Kuala Lumpur
Malay culture